The Parable of the Faithful Servant (or Parable of the Door Keeper) is a parable of Jesus found in Matthew 24:42-51, Mark 13:34-37, and Luke 12:35-48 about how it is important for the faithful to keep watch.

In Matthew's Gospel, it immediately precedes the Parable of the Ten Virgins, which has a similar eschatological theme of being prepared for the day of reckoning.

Narrative 
In Luke's Gospel, the parable reads as follows:

Interpretation
In Matthew, the parable opens with the injunction: "Therefore keep watch, because you do not know on what day your Lord will come" (Matthew 24:42). In other words, "the disciple must remain prepared for his Lord's coming, remaining alert and awake at his post." Even though there may be general signs of Jesus' Second Coming, the exact time is unknown. This is a theme which has also been discussed earlier in Luke 12. The reference to a wedding banquet in Luke 12:36 suggests a heavenly banquet, and recalls the parable of the Ten Virgins, which follows this parable in Matthew.

The second part of the parable includes a caution that much will be more required of the person to whom much is given. J. Dwight Pentecost writes that this parable "emphasizes that privilege brings responsibility and that responsibility entails accountability." This applies particularly to religious leaders.

Hymns
The parable is the theme for several hymns, including Philip Doddridge's "Ye Servants of the Lord," which ends:

Christ shall the banquet spread
With His own royal hand,
And raise that faithful servant’s
Amid the angelic band.

See also
 Life of Jesus in the New Testament
 Ministry of Jesus
 Parable of the Master and Servant
 Parable of the great banquet
 Parable of the Wedding Feast

References

Faithful Servant, Parable of the